Luca Cecchini (born 10 April 1993) is an Italian footballer.

References

1993 births
People from San Daniele del Friuli
Footballers from Friuli Venezia Giulia
Living people
Italian footballers
Association football defenders
U.S. Triestina Calcio 1918 players
Virtus Entella players
S.S. Teramo Calcio players
S.S.D. Lucchese 1905 players
A.S. Sambenedettese players
Serie B players
Serie C players